The 1922 Gower by-election was held on 20 July 1922.  The by-election was held due to the death of the incumbent Labour MP, John Williams.  It was won by the Labour candidate David Grenfell.

See also
 Gower constituency
 1888 Gower by-election
 1982 Gower by-election
 List of United Kingdom by-elections (1918–1931)
 United Kingdom by-election records

References

Further reading 
 
 
 A Vision Of Britain Through Time (Constituency elector numbers)

1922 elections in the United Kingdom
1922 in Wales
1920s elections in Wales
Elections in Swansea
Gower Peninsula
By-elections to the Parliament of the United Kingdom in Welsh constituencies
20th century in Swansea
July 1922 events